Pan is a 1922 Norwegian film directed by Harald Schwenzen. It was the first of four film adaptations of the  novel of the same name by 1920 Nobel Prize winner Knut Hamsun, and one of the earliest Scandinavian adaptations of a Hamsun work (preceded only by a 1921 film of Growth of the Soil).  It tells the story of a romance between a wealthy woman and a soldier, and was filmed in Nordland and in Algeria (standing in for the Indian locations in the novel).

According to author Donald Dewey, Pan was popular with the Norwegian public, but when Hamsun himself was asked for his reaction, he commented only, "I don’t understand film and I am in bed with the flu," and hung up.  Michael Wilmington of the Chicago Tribune describes it as "A fine film and a real discovery".

References

External links 
 

1922 films
1920s Norwegian-language films
Norwegian black-and-white films
Norwegian silent films
1922 drama films
Films based on works by Knut Hamsun
Norwegian drama films
Silent drama films